Badalgacchi is a Upazila of Naogaon District under Rajshahi Division, Bangladesh.

Geography

Demographics
According to 2011 Bangladesh census, Badalgachhi had a population of 193,256. Males constituted 49.95% of the population and females 50.05%. Muslims formed 86.49% of the population, Hindus 9.91%, Christians 0.15% and others 3.15%. Badalgachhi had a literacy rate of 49.55% for the population 7 years and above.

In 1991, the population of Badalgacchia was 176,010. Males constitute 51.34% of the population, and females account for 48.66%. Badalgachi has an average literacy rate of 28.4% for persons seven years and older, which is below the national average of 32.4%.

Points of interest
Somapura Mahavihara is situated in Paaharpur village.

Administration
Badalgachhi, foemed as a Thana in 1807, was converted into an upazila in 1983.

The Upazila is divided into eight union parishads: Adhaipur, Badalgachhi, Balubhara,  Bilasbari, Kola, Mathurapur, Mithapur, and Paharpur. The union parishads are subdivided into 247 mauzas and 238 villages.

References

Upazilas of Naogaon District